Thomas Leigh (2 February 1875 – 24 January 1914) was an English professional footballer who played as a centre-forward. Born in Derby, he played in the Football League for New Brighton Tower, Burton Swifts and Newton Heath. He also played in the Southern League for New Brompton and Brentford.

Career statistics

References

External links
Profile at StretfordEnd.co.uk
Profile at MUFCInfo.com

1875 births
Footballers from Derby
English footballers
Association football forwards
Derby County F.C. players
Burton Swifts F.C. players
New Brighton Tower F.C. players
Manchester United F.C. players
Gillingham F.C. players
Brentford F.C. players
English Football League players
Southern Football League players
1914 deaths